Torben Grimmel (born 23 November 1975 in Odder) is a Danish sport shooter who competed in the 1996 Summer Olympics, the 2000 Summer Olympics, the 2004 Summer Olympics and the 2012 Summer Olympics.  He competes in the men's 50 metre rifle prone event, and won the silver medal at the 2000 Summer Olympics.

References

1975 births
Living people
Danish male sport shooters
ISSF rifle shooters
Olympic shooters of Denmark
Shooters at the 1996 Summer Olympics
Shooters at the 2000 Summer Olympics
Shooters at the 2004 Summer Olympics
Shooters at the 2012 Summer Olympics
Shooters at the 2016 Summer Olympics
Olympic silver medalists for Denmark
Olympic medalists in shooting
Medalists at the 2000 Summer Olympics
People from Odder Municipality
Sportspeople from the Central Denmark Region